Zhentou Town is a rural town in Liuyang City, Hunan Province, People's Republic of China. It is bordered to the north by Jiangbei Town, to the east by towns of Puji, Gejia and Guanqiao, to the south by Lusong District and Hetang District of Zhuzhou, and to the west by Baijia Town.

Administrative division
The town is divided into eight villages and two communities, the following areas: 
 Tianping Community
 Beixing Community
 Gankou Village
 Jinpai Village
 Yuelong Village
 Jiangdong Village
 Baishu Village
 Jintian Village
 Gantang Village
 Shuangqiao Village

Economy
The main industries in and around the town are food processing, vegetables, fruits and animal farming.

Geography
Liuyang River, more commonly known as the "mother river", flows through the town.

There are two reservoirs within the town: Xianrenzao Reservoir and Gantang Reservoir.

Mountain located adjacent to and visible from the townsite are: Jiziling.

Education
There is one middle school and one high school in the town: Zhentou Middle School and Liuyang No. 5 High School, both are public schools.

Transportation

Railway
The Shanghai–Kunming railway, from Shanghai to Kunming, through the town.

The Hangzhou–Changsha high-speed railway, which connects Hangzhou and Changsha, runs through the town.

Expressway
Two expressways run through the town: Liuyang–Liling Expressway and Shanghai–Kunming Expressway.

Provincial Highway
The Provincial Highway S211 runs southwest to northeast through the town.

Attractions
Three Tourism development zones located in the town: Zhongfo Temple, Baibu Isle and Daji.

Celebrity
, revolutionary of the Chinese Communist Party.
Chen Wenxin, biologist and academician of the Chinese Academy of Sciences.

References

Divisions of Liuyang
Liuyang